He Qinglian is a Chinese author and economist, most prominently known for her critical view of Chinese society and media controls in China.

Biography
She was born in Shaoyang, Hunan, China, in 1956. She studied history in Hunan Normal University from 1979 to 1983. In 1988 she received a master's degree in economics from Fudan University in Shanghai, China. She worked in universities in Hunan and Guangdong for several years. Later she became a newspaper editor in Shenzhen, Guangdong. She wrote many articles and several books on Chinese society and the Chinese economy. The Pitfalls of Modernization, her most famous book, sold over 100,000 copies in China and won acclaim from both the public and economists. She argues in Pitfalls that, as power has devolved to local government, local officials who at first favored reform later came to oppose further reform which might limit their discretion and so make it harder to trade power for money and money for power. In the latter part of Pitfalls she also discussed the revival of clan power in southern provinces such as Guangdong and Fujian. Her articles, which point to deep structural problems and declare that thoroughgoing political reform will be necessary if economic reform is to succeed, displeased some Chinese government officials. Consequently, she received more and more pressure in China, and on June 14, 2001, she left home and fled abroad. She now lives in the United States.

He Qinglian's articles often appear in the Chinese language press outside of China. Her book Media Control in China was published online in Chinese (with an English language summary) by Human Rights in China in 2004 and serialized on the website of a scholarly Chinese language quarterly based in New Jersey, Modern China Studies. A revised and expanded edition was published in Taipei by Liming Cultural Enterprises in 2006.

External links
 He Qinglian, Author, Economist, China (int'l edition)
 He Qinglian Comments on Writing the Pitfalls of Modernization
 Media Control in China, translated excerpts.
  Some He Qinglian Englilsh language articles listed on her Chinese language blog.
 Media Control in China 2004 edition , full Chinese text (PDF)
 Media Control in China revised 2006 Chinese language edition, publication notice
 "The Hijacked Potential of China's Internet", a chapter from the forthcoming English language translation of Media Control in China, in the 2/2006 issue of China Rights Forum
 He Qinglian articles in Modern China Studies (Chinese text)

1956 births
Living people
Chinese emigrants to the United States
Chinese women writers
Chinese women economists
Charter 08 signatories
People's Republic of China essayists
People from Shaoyang
Writers from Hunan
Fudan University alumni
Chinese dissidents
Hunan Normal University alumni
Economists from Hunan